Amphibious warfare is a type of offensive military operation that today uses naval ships to project ground and air power onto a hostile or potentially hostile shore at a designated landing beach. Through history the operations were conducted using ship's boats as the primary method of delivering troops to shore. Since the Gallipoli Campaign, specialised watercraft were increasingly designed for landing troops, material and vehicles, including by landing craft and for insertion of commandos, by fast patrol boats, zodiacs (rigid inflatable boats) and from mini-submersibles. The term amphibious first emerged in the United Kingdom and the United States during the 1930s with introduction of vehicles such as Vickers-Carden-Loyd Light Amphibious Tank or the Landing Vehicle Tracked.

Amphibious warfare includes operations defined by their type, purpose, scale and means of execution. In the British Empire at the time these were called combined operations which were defined as "...operations where naval, military or air forces in any combination are co-operating with each other, working independently under their respective commanders, but with a common strategic object." All armed forces that employ troops with special training and equipment for conducting landings from naval vessels to shore agree to this definition. Since the 20th century an amphibious landing of troops on a beachhead is acknowledged as the most complex of all military maneuvers. The undertaking requires an intricate coordination of numerous military specialties, including air power, naval gunfire, naval transport, logistical planning, specialized equipment, land warfare, tactics, and extensive training in the nuances of this maneuver for all personnel involved.

In essence, amphibious operations consist of the phases of strategic planning and preparation, operational transit to the intended theatre of operations, pre-landing rehearsal and disembarkation, troop landings, beachhead consolidation and conducting inland ground and air operations. Historically, within the scope of these phases a vital part of success was often based on the military logistics, naval gunfire and close air support. Another factor is the variety and quantity of specialised vehicles and equipment used by the landing force that are designed for the specific needs of this type of operation. Amphibious operations can be classified as tactical or operational raids such as the Dieppe Raid, operational landings in support of a larger land strategy such as the Kerch–Eltigen Operation, and a strategic opening of a new Theatre of Operations, for example the Operation Avalanche. The purpose of amphibious operations is usually offensive, except in cases of amphibious withdrawals, but is limited by the plan and terrain. Such an operation may be prepared and planned in days or weeks, and would employ a naval task force to land less than a division of troops.

The intent of operational landings is usually to exploit the shore as a vulnerability in the enemy's overall position, forcing redeployment of forces, premature use of reserves, and aiding a larger allied offensive effort elsewhere. Such an operation requiring weeks to months of preparation and planning, would use multiple task forces, or even a naval fleet to land corps-size forces, including on large islands, for example Operation Chromite. A strategic landing operation requires a major commitment of forces to invade a national territory in the archipelagic, such as the Battle of Leyte, or continental, such as Operation Neptune. Such an operation may require multiple naval and air fleets to support the landings, and extensive intelligence gathering and planning of over a year. Although most amphibious operations are thought of primarily as beach landings, they can exploit available shore infrastructure to land troops directly into an urban environment if unopposed. In this case non-specialised ships can offload troops, vehicles and cargo using organic or facility wharf-side equipment. Tactical landings in the past have utilised small boats, small craft, small ships and civilian vessels converted for the mission to deliver troops to the water's edge.

Preparation and planning 
Preparation and planning the naval landing operation requires the assembly of vessels with sufficient capacity to lift necessary troops employing combat loading. It can also include conducting amphibious reconnaissance. The military intelligence services produce a briefing on the expected opponent which guides the organisation and equipping of the embarked force. First specially designed landing craft were used for the Gallipoli landings, and armoured tracked vehicles were also available for the Guadalcanal Campaign. Helicopters were first used to support beach landings during Operation Musketeer.

Hovercraft have been in use for naval landings by military forces since the 1960s.

Recorded amphibious warfare goes back to ancient times. The Sea Peoples menaced the Egyptians from the reign of Akhenaten as captured on the reliefs at Medinet Habu and Karnak.

The Hellenic city states routinely resorted to opposed assaults upon each other's shores, which they reflected upon in their plays and other expressions of art. The landing at Marathon by the Persians on 9 September 490 BC was the largest amphibious operation until it was eclipsed by the landings at the Battle of Gallipoli.

Marines 

In 1565, the island of Malta was invaded by the Ottoman Turks during the Great Siege of Malta, forcing its defenders to retreat to the fortified cities. A strategic choke point in the Mediterranean Sea, its loss would have been so menacing for the Western European kingdoms that forces were urgently raised in order to relieve the island. But it took four months to train, arm, and move a 5,500-man amphibious force to lift the siege.

Then, Philip II, King of Spain decided to train and assign amphibious-assault skilled units to the Royal Armada. These units were trained specifically for fighting on and from ships. The Spanish Marines were born. The idea was to set up a permanent assignation of land troops to the Royal Spanish Navy, available for the Crown.

Thus other countries adopted the idea and subsequently raised their own, early marine forces as well.

The first "professional" marine units were already task-trained amphibious troops, but instead of being disbanded, were kept for the Spanish Crown's needs. Their first actions took place all along the Mediterranean Sea where the Turks and pirate settlements were a risk for commerce and navigation: Algiers, Malta, Gelves.

The "Terceras Landing" in the Azores Islands on 25 May 1583, was a military feat as its planners decided to make a fake landing to distract the defending forces (5,000 Portuguese, English and French soldiers); also special seagoing barges were arranged in order to unload cavalry horses and 700 artillery pieces on the beach; special rowing boats were armed with small cannons to support the landing boats; special supplies were readied to be unloaded and support the 11,000-man landing force strength. The total strength of the amphibious force was 15,000 men, including an armada of 90 ships.

Development

From the 15th to the 20th centuries, several European countries established and expanded overseas colonies. Amphibious operations mostly aimed to settle colonies and to secure strong points along navigational routes. Amphibious forces were fully organized and devoted to this mission, although the troops not only fought ashore, but on board ships.

By their nature amphibious assaults involve highly complex operations, demanding the coordination of disparate elements; therefore disastrous results can ensue from insufficient planning. One of the most spectacular instances of such a failure occurred in 1741 at the Battle of Cartagena de Indias in New Granada, when a large British amphibious assault force with a divided command failed to overcome a much smaller but heavily fortified Spanish defence. Twenty years later, in 1762, a similar British force successfully landed at Havana in Cuba, besieged the city and captured it after a two-month campaign thanks to improved coordination of land and sea forces.

A major amphibious landing took place during the Siege of Quebec in 1759, as part of the Seven Years' War. The British produced the first specially designed landing-craft in order to enable their troops to cross the Saint Lawrence River in force. After considering and rejecting a number of plans for landings on the north shore of the river, General James Wolfe and his brigadiers decided in late August to land upriver of the city.

The British prepared for their risky deployment upstream. Troops had already been aboard landing ships and drifting up and down the river for several days when on 12 September Wolfe made a final decision on the British landing site, selecting L'Anse-au-Foulon. Wolfe's plan of attack depended on secrecy and surprise — a key element of a successful amphibious operation — a small party of men would land by night on the north shore, climb the tall cliff, seize a small road, and overpower the garrison that protected it, allowing the bulk of his army (5,000 men) to ascend the cliff by the small road and then deploy for battle on the plateau. The operation proved a success, leading to the surrender of the city, and heavily influenced subsequent engagements.

In 1762 British Royal Navy sailors and marines succeed in taking the capitals of the Spanish West and East Indies: Havana in Cuba and Manila in the Philippines respectively. In 1776 Samuel Nicholas and the Continental Marines, the "progenitor" of the United States Marine Corps, made a first successful landing in the Raid of Nassau in the Bahamas.

In 1782 The British rebuffed a long Franco-Spanish attempt to seize Gibraltar by water-borne forces. In 1783 a Franco-Spanish force invaded the British-held island of Minorca. In 1798 Minorca experienced yet another of its many changes of sovereignty when captured by a British landing.

As the British Empire expanded worldwide, four colonies (Halifax, in Nova Scotia; Bermuda; Gibraltar; and Malta) were designated Imperial fortresses, from which Britain's domination of the oceans and the Mediterranean and Caribbean seas was maintained, including its ability to deny safe passage to enemy naval and merchant vessels while protecting its own merchant trade, as well as to its ability to project superior naval and military force anywhere on the planet. This was demonstrated during the American War of 1812, when the ships of the North America Station of the Royal Navy and military forces of the British Army, Board of Ordnance, and Royal Marines, maintained a blockade of much of the Atlantic seaboard of the United States of America, carried out amphibious raids such as the 22 June 1813 Battle of Craney Island, and then launched the Chesapeake Campaign (defeating American forces in the Battle of Bladensburg, capturing and burning Washington, DC, and raiding Alexandria, Virginia), from Bermuda.

Industrial era
In the Mexican–American War, US forces under Winfield Scott launched the first major amphibious assault in US history in the 1847 Siege of Veracruz. During the Crimean War of 1853–1856 the anti-Russian alliance launched an Anglo-French amphibious operation against Russia at Bomarsund, Finland on 8 August 1854. During the American Civil War of 1861–1865 the United States made several amphibious assaults along the coastlines of the Confederate States. Actions at Hatteras Inlet (August 1861) and at Port Royal, South Carolina were the first of many attacks, others occurring on Roanoke Island, NC; Galveston, TX; Fort Sumter, Morris Island and James Island, SC; and several more. The largest such clash happened in January 1865 at Fort Fisher—the largest and most powerful fort in the world at the time—which protected the entrance of Wilmington, North Carolina. The assaulting force consisted of over 15,000 men and 70 warships with over 600 guns.

During the American Civil War, the Mississippi Marine Brigade was established to act swiftly against Confederate forces operating near the Mississippi River and its tributaries. The unit consisted of artillery, cavalry and infantry with the United States Ram Fleet used as transportation.

Amphibious warfare during the War of the Pacific of 1879 to 1883 saw coordination of army, navy and specialized units. The first amphibious assault of this war took place during the Battle of Pisagua when 2,100 Chilean troops successfully took Pisagua from 1,200 Peruvian and Bolivian defenders on 2 November 1879. Chilean Navy ships bombarded beach defenses for several hours at dawn, followed by open, oared boats landing army infantry and sapper units into waist-deep water, under enemy fire. An outnumbered first landing-wave fought at the beach; the second and third waves in the following hours succeeded in overcoming resistance and moving inland. By the end of the day, an expeditionary army of 10,000 had disembarked at the captured port.

In 1881 Chilean ships transported approximately 30,000 men, along with their mounts and equipment,  in order to attack Lima. Chilean commanders commissioned purpose-built, flat-bottomed landing craft that would deliver troops in shallow water closer to the beach, possibly the first purpose-built amphibious landing-craft in history: "These [36 shallow draft, flat-bottomed] boats would be able to land three thousand men and twelve guns in a single wave".

Neutral military observers closely studied landing tactics and operations during the War of the Pacific: two Royal Navy ships monitored the Battle of Pisagua; United States Navy observer Lt. Theodorus B. M. Mason included an account in his report The War on the Pacific Coast of South America. The  with Alfred Thayer Mahan in command, was stationed at Callao, Peru, protecting American interests during the final stages of the War of the Pacific. He formulated his concept of sea power while reading a history book in an English gentleman's club in Lima, Peru. This concept became the foundation for his celebrated The Influence of Sea Power upon History (1890).

An amphibious assault took place on the beaches of Veracruz, Mexico in 1914, when the United States Navy attacked and occupied the city as result of the Tampico Affair.

Modern operations

World War I marked the beginning of the first modern amphibious warfare operations. However, tactics and equipment were still rudimentary and required much improvisation.

At the time, British Royal Marine Light Infantry (merged with the Royal Marine Artillery in the 1920s to form the Royal Marines) were used primarily as naval parties onboard Royal Navy warships to maintain discipline and man ships' guns. The RMLI joined a new Royal Navy division, the Royal Naval Division, formed in 1914 (out of those not needed on ships) to fight on land; however, throughout the conflict, army units were depended upon to provide the bulk, if not all, of troops used in amphibious landings.

The first amphibious assault of the war was the Battle of Bita Paka (11 September 1914) was fought south of Kabakaul, on the island of New Britain, and was a part of the invasion and subsequent occupation of German New Guinea by the Australian Naval and Military Expeditionary Force (AN&MEF) shortly after the outbreak of the First World War. The first British amphibious assault of the war ended in disaster in November 1914. A large British Indian Army force was directed to launch an amphibious assault on Tanga, German East Africa. British actions prior to the assault, however, alerted the Germans to prepare to repel an invasion. The Indian forces suffered heavy casualties when they advanced on the city, forcing them to withdraw back to their boats, leaving much of their equipment behind.

The Russian army and navy also grew adept to amphibious warfare in the Black Sea, conducting many raids and bombardments on Ottoman positions.

On the 11 October 1917, German land and naval forces launched an amphibious assault, code named Operation Albion, on the islands of Saaremaa (Ösel), Hiiumaa (Dagö) and Muhu (Moon); they controlled the entrance to the Gulf of Riga. By the end of the month German forces had successfully overrun the islands forcing the Russians to abandon them with the loss of some 20,000 troops, 100 guns and the pre-dreadnought battleship Slava. The capture of the islands opened a route for German naval forces into the Gulf of Finland threatening the city of Petrograd, a fact that contributed to the cessation of hostilities on the Eastern front.

Gallipoli

The first large scale amphibious operations, ones that were to heavily influence theorists in the decades to come, were conducted as part of the Battle of Gallipoli in 1915 against the Ottoman Empire during World War I. The Gallipoli peninsula forms the northern bank of the Dardanelles, a strait that provided a sea route to what was then the Russian Empire, one of the Allied powers during the war. Intending to secure it, Russia's allies Britain and France launched a naval attack followed by an amphibious landing on the peninsula with the eventual aim of capturing the Ottoman capital of Constantinople (modern-day Istanbul). Although the naval attack was repelled and the land campaign failed, the campaign was the first modern amphibious landing, and featured air support, specialized landing craft and a naval bombardment.

The seaplane tender  supported the landings under the command of Commander Robert Clark-Hall. Seaplanes were used for aerial reconnaissance, ground support for the troops landing at Anzac Cove and the bombing of fortifications. Ark Royal was augmented by a squadron from the No. 3 Squadron of the Royal Naval Air Service, operating from a nearby island.

Initial landings took place in unmodified rowing boats that were extremely vulnerable to attack from the shore defences. The first purpose-built landing craft were built for the campaign. SS River Clyde, built as a collier, was adapted to be a landing ship for the Landing at Cape Helles. Openings were cut in her steel hull as sally ports from which troops would emerge onto gangways and then to a bridge of smaller boats from the ship to the beach. Boiler plate and sandbags were mounted on her bow, and behind them a battery of 11 machine guns was installed. The machine gun battery was manned by Royal Naval Air Service men. Work began on painting River Clydes hull sandy yellow as camouflage, but this was incomplete by the time of the landing.

It was soon clear that the Turkish defence was equipped with rapid-fire weapons, which meant that ordinary landing boats were inadequate for the task. In February 1915, orders were placed for the design of purpose built landing craft. A design was created in four days resulting in an order for 200 'X' Lighters with a spoon-shaped bow to take shelving beaches and a drop down frontal ramp.

The first use took place after they had been towed to the Aegean and performed successfully in the 6 August landing at Suvla Bay of IX Corps, commanded by Commander Edward Unwin.

'X' Lighters, known to the soldiers as 'Beetles', carried about 500 men, displaced 135 tons and were based on London barges being 105 feet, 6 inches long, 21 feet wide, and 7 feet, 6 inches deep. The engines mainly ran on heavy oil and ran at a speed of approximately 5 knots. The sides of the ships were bullet proof, and was designed with a ramp on the bow for disembarkation. A plan was devised to land British heavy tanks from pontoons in support of the Third Battle of Ypres, but this was abandoned.

The lessons of the Gallipoli campaign had a significant impact upon the development of amphibious operational planning, and have since been studied by military planners prior to operations such as the Normandy Landings in 1944 and during the Falklands War in 1982. The campaign also influenced US Marine Corps amphibious operations during the Pacific War, and continues to influence US amphibious doctrine.

During the interwar period the campaign "became a focal point for the study of amphibious warfare" in the United Kingdom and United States, because it involved the four types of amphibious operations: the raid, demonstration, assault and withdrawal. Analysis of the campaign before World War II led to a belief among many armed forces that amphibious assaults could not succeed against modern defences. The perception continued until the Normandy Landings in June 1944, despite some successful examples of amphibious operations earlier in the war, such as those in Italy, and at Tarawa and in the Gilbert Islands in the Pacific. Although the negative perception prevailed among Allied planners in the interwar years, the war situation after 1940 meant that such operations had to be considered. However, despite early successes in North Africa and Italy, it was not until Normandy that the belief that opposed landings could not succeed was completely excised.

Interwar developments
One of the first amphibious landings involving armour was conducted by the Irish National Army in 1922, during the Irish Civil War. Landings against Republican rebels at Westport, Fenit and Cork all involved armour cars. The Westport and Fenit landings involved light armoured cars and 18-pounder artillery guns being hoisted off the ships by crane. Heavier armoured cars were used at Cork, resulting in some difficulty. While Irish troops could reach the coast in small boats from naval vessels offshore, the ships had to dock to unload the heavy vehicles and artillery guns. These operations were a major success for the Irish government forces, mainly due to the element of surprise and the use of armoured vehicles and artillery. Government forces were able to capture all the major towns and cities in southern Ireland.

The Alhucemas landing on 8 September 1925, performed by a Spanish-French coalition against rebel Berber tribesmen in the north of Morocco, was an amphibious landing where tanks were used for the first time and massive aerial and naval gunfire support was employed by the landing forces, directed by spotting personnel with communication devices.

Floating depots were organized with medical, water, ammunition and food supplies, to be dispatched ashore when needed. The barges used in this landing were the surviving "K" boats from Gallipoli, upgraded in Spanish shipyards.

In 1938, Japanese forces attacked Chinese defenders over the Yangtze River at the Battle of Wuhan. Soon, the Japanese would later further improve its techniques upon seaborne assaults by the Second Sino-Japanese War. By World War II, marines such as the Special Naval Landing Force, used amphibious landings to attack and sweep across territories in South East Asia. Their technique of surprise landings in continuous success and the support from the Navy, inspired the British and American landings in World War II such as D-Day and the Pacific Campaign.

Britain

During the inter-war period, the combination of the negative experience at Gallipoli and economic stringency contributed to the delay in procuring equipment and adopting a universal doctrine for amphibious operations in the Royal Navy.

The costly failure of the Gallipoli campaign coupled with the emerging potential of airpower satisfied many in naval and military circles that the age of amphibious operations had come to a close. Still, throughout the 1920s and 1930s, animated discussion in Staff Colleges in Britain and the Indian Army Staff College at Quetta surrounded the strategic potential of the Dardanelles campaign compared with the strategic stalemate of the Western Front. The economic austerity of the worldwide economic depression and the government's adoption of the Ten Year Rule assured that such theoretical talk would not result in the procurement of any large scale equipment.

Despite this outlook, the British produced the Motor Landing Craft in 1920, based on their experience with the early 'Beetle' armoured transport. The craft could put a medium tank directly onto a beach. From 1924, it was used with landing boats in annual exercises in amphibious landings. It was later called Landing Craft, Mechanized (LCM) and was the predecessor of all Allied landing craft mechanised (LCM).

The Army and Royal Navy formed a landing craft committee to "recommend... the design of landing craft". A prototype motor landing craft, designed by J. Samuel White of Cowes, was built and first sailed in 1926. It weighed 16 tons and had a box-like appearance, having a square bow and stern. To prevent fouling of the propellers in a craft destined to spend time in surf and possibly be beached, a crude waterjet propulsion system was devised by White's designers. A Hotchkiss petrol engine drove a centrifugal pump which produced a jet of water, pushing the craft ahead or astern, and steering it, according to how the jet was directed. Speed was 5-6 knots and its beaching capacity was good. By 1930, three MLC were operated by the Royal Navy.

For a short journey, from shore to shore, the cargo could be rolled or carried into the boat over its ramp. On longer journeys, ship to shore, a derrick would lower the MLC into the sea from the transporting vessel. The derrick would then lower the vehicle or cargo load. Upon touching down on shore, soldiers or vehicles exited by the bow ramp.

Although there was much official apathy toward amphibious operations, this began to change in the late 1930s. The Royal Naval Staff College at Greenwich, drafted a document detailing combined operations requirements and submitted it to the Chiefs of Staff in 1936. The document recommended the establishment of an inter-service 'Training and Development Centre', with a permanent force of Royal Marines attached to it. Its functions were to "train in all methods for the seizure of defended beaches; develop the materiel necessary for such methods, with special regard to protection of troops, speed of landing, and the attainment of surprise; and develop methods and materiel for the destruction or neutralization of enemy defenses, including bombardment and aircraft co-operation.

The Inter-Service Training and Development Centre was established at Fort Cumberland, near Portsmouth in 1938, and brought together representatives from the Royal Navy, Army, and Royal Air Force convened with the portfolio of developing methods and equipment to use in Combined Operations.

The Centre examined certain specific problems, including craft for landing tanks, beach organisation, floating piers, headquarters ships, amphibian tanks, underwater obstacles, the landing of water and petrol and the use of small craft in amphibious raids By the end of 1939 the ISTDC had codified a policy for landings, and defended it at Staff College discussions. Operational experience during the Second World War introduced modifications to this landing policy, but it was essentially the policy used in the Torch and Husky landings four years later.

The essential shape of this landing policy is described by Bernard Fergusson in The Watery Maze, 

Among the many tactical innovations introduced by the centre, codified in the Manual on Combined Operations and the Standard Naval Bombardment Code, was the use of Floating Piers (pontoons) to bridge the water gap, the creation of Smoke Generating devices to obscure the assault and the use of infra-red directional beacons for landing accuracy. The centre also played a role in the development of the first specialized landing crafts, including the Assault Landing Craft, the Mechanized Landing Craft (LCM(1)), the Landing Craft Tank (Mk. 1), Support Landing Craft LCS(1), LCS(2) and Landing Ship Infantry.

Divisional-sized amphibious landing exercises were carried out by the British Army in the 1930s.

United States

In contrast to the British attitude, the U.S. military, especially the Marine Corps remained enthusiastic at the possibilities of amphibious warfare. The Marine Corps was searching for an expanded mission after World War I, during which it had merely been used as a junior version of the Army infantry. During the 1920s, it found a new mission — to be a fast-reacting, light infantry fighting force carried rapidly to far off locations by the US Navy. Its special role would be amphibious landings on enemy-held islands, but it took years to figure out how to do that. The Mahanian notion of a decisive fleet battle required forward bases for the Navy close to the enemy. After the Spanish–American War the Marines gained the mission of occupying and defending those forward bases, and began a training program on Culebra Island, Puerto Rico.

As early as 1900 the General Board of the United States Navy considered building advance bases for naval operations in the Pacific and the Caribbean. The Marine Corps was given this mission in 1920, but the challenge was to avoid another disaster like Gallipoli. The conceptual breakthrough came in 1921 when Major "Pete" Ellis wrote Advanced Base Operations in Micronesia a secret 30,000-word manifesto that proved inspirational to Marine strategists and highly prophetic. To win a war in the Pacific, the Navy would have to fight its way through thousands of miles of ocean controlled by the Japanese—including the Marshall, Caroline, Marianas and Ryukyu island chains. If the Navy could land Marines to seize selected islands, they could become forward bases.

Ellis argued that with an enemy prepared to defend the beaches, success depended on high-speed movement of waves of assault craft, covered by heavy naval gunfire and attack from the air. He predicted that the decisive action would take place on the beach itself, so the assault teams would need not just infantry but also machine gun units, light artillery, light tanks, and combat engineers to defeat beach obstacles and defenses. Assuming the enemy had its own artillery, the landing craft would have to be specially built to protect the landing force. The failure at Gallipoli came because the Turks could easily reinforce the specific landing sites. The Japanese would be unable to land new forces on the islands under attack.

Not knowing which of the many islands would be the American target, the Japanese would have to disperse their strength by garrisoning many islands that would never be attacked. An island like Eniwetok in the Marshall Islands, would, Ellis estimated, require two regiments, or 4,000 Marines. Guided by Marine observer aircraft, and supplemented by Marine light bombers, warships would provide enough firepower so that Marines would not need any heavy artillery (in contrast to the Army, which relied heavily on its artillery). Shelling defended islands was a new mission for warships. The Ellis model was officially endorsed in 1927 by the Joint Board of the Army and Navy (a forerunner of the Joint Chiefs of Staff).

However, actual implementation of the new mission took another decade because the Marine Corps was preoccupied in Central America and the Navy was slow to start training in how to support the landings. The prototype advanced base force officially evolved into the Fleet Marine Force (FMF) in 1933. In 1939, during the annual Fleet Landing Exercises, the FMF became interested in the military potential of Andrew Higgins's design of a powered, shallow-draught boat. These LCVPs, dubbed the 'Higgins Boats', were reviewed and passed by the U.S. Naval Bureau of Construction and Repair. Soon, the Higgins boats were developed to a final design with a ramp, and were produced in large numbers.

Second World War

By the Second World War tactics and equipment had moved on. The first use of British landing craft in an opposed landing in the Second World War, saw the disembarkation of French Foreign Legionnaires of the 13th Demi-Brigade and supporting French Hotchkiss H39 tanks on the beach at Bjerkvik, eight miles (13 km) above Narvik, on 13 May during the Norwegian campaign.

The first major and successful amphibious operation was Operation Ironclad, a British campaign to capture Vichy French-controlled Madagascar. The naval contingent consisted of over 50 vessels, drawn from Force H, the British Home Fleet and the British Eastern Fleet, commanded by Rear Admiral Edward Neville Syfret.

The fleet included the aircraft carrier Illustrious, her sister ship Indomitable and the aging battleship Ramillies to cover the landings. The first wave of the British 29th Infantry Brigade and No. 5 Commando landed in assault craft on 5 May 1942, follow-up waves were by two brigades of the 5th Infantry Division and Royal Marines. Air cover was provided mainly by Fairey Albacore and Fairey Swordfish torpedo bombers which attacked Vichy shipping.

Purpose-built landing craft were among the vessels used at the evacuation from Dunkirk (Operation Dynamo) and an amphibious operation was tried out at Dieppe in 1942. The operation proved a costly failure, but the lessons, hard learned, were used later. Many small-scale operations were conducted by the Allies on the Axis-held coast of Europe, including raids on the Lofoten Islands, St Nazaire and Bruneval.

Specialized infantry landing craft

In the run up to World War II, many specialized landing craft, both for infantry and vehicles, were developed. In November 1938, the Inter-Service Training and Development Centre proposed a new type of landing craft. Its specifications were to weigh less than ten long tons, to be able to carry the thirty-one men of a British Army platoon and five assault engineers or signallers, and to be so shallow drafted as to be able to land them, wet only up to their knees, in eighteen inches of water. All of these specifications made the Landing Craft Assault; a separate set of requirements were laid down for a vehicle and supplies carrier, although previously the two roles had been combined in the Motor Landing Craft.

J. S. White of Cowes built a prototype to the Fleming design. Eight weeks later the craft was doing trials on the Clyde. All landing craft designs must find a compromise between two divergent priorities; the qualities that make a good sea boat are opposite those that make a craft suitable for beaching.
The craft had a hull built of double-diagonal mahogany planking. The sides were plated with "10lb. DIHT" armour, a heat treated steel based on D1 steel, in this case Hadfield's Resista ".

The Landing Craft Assault remained the most common British and Commonwealth landing craft of World War II, and the humblest vessel admitted to the books of the Royal Navy on D-Day. Prior to July 1942, these craft were referred to as "Assault Landing Craft" (ALC), but "Landing Craft; Assault" (LCA) was used thereafter to conform with the joint US-UK nomenclature system.

The Landing Craft Infantry was a stepped up amphibious assault ship, developed in response to a British request for a vessel capable of carrying and landing substantially more troops than the smaller Landing Craft Assault (LCA). The result was a small steel ship that could land 200 troops, traveling from rear bases on its own bottom at a speed of up to 15 knots. The original British design was envisioned as being a "one time use" vessel which would simply ferry the troops across the English Channel, and were considered an expendable vessel. As such, no troop sleeping accommodations were placed in the original design. This was changed shortly after initial use of these ships, when it was discovered that many missions would require overnight accommodations.

The first LCI(L)s entered service in 1943 chiefly with the Royal Navy (RN) and United States Navy. Some 923 LCI were built in ten American shipyards and 211 provided under lend-lease to the Royal Navy.

Specialized vehicle landing craft
Following the Inter-Service Training and Development Centre's (ISTDC) successful development of the infantry carrying LCA, attention turned to the means of efficiently delivering a tank to a beach in 1938. Inquires were made of the army as to the heaviest tank that might be employed in a landing operation. The army wanted to be able to land a 12-ton tank, but the ISTDC, anticipating weight increases in future tank models specified 16 tons burthen for Mechanised Landing Craft designs. Another governor on any design was the need to land tanks and other vehicles in less than approximately  feet of water.

Design work began at John I. Thornycroft Ltd. in May 1938 with trials completing in February 1940. Although early LCM(1)s were powered by two Thornycroft 60 bhp petrol engines, the majority were powered by Chrysler, in-line, 6-cylinder Crown petrol engines. Constructed of steel and selectively clad with armour plate, this shallow-draft, barge-like boat with a crew of 6, could ferry a tank of 16 long tons to shore at 7 knots (13 km/h). Depending on the weight of the tank to be transported the craft might be lowered into the water by its davits already loaded or could have the tank placed in it after being lowered into the water.

Although the Royal Navy had the Landing Craft Mechanised at its disposal, in 1940, Prime Minister Winston Churchill demanded an amphibious vessel capable of landing at least three 36-ton heavy tanks directly onto a beach, able to sustain itself at sea for at least a week, and inexpensive and easy to build. Admiral Maund, Director of the Inter-Service Training and Development Centre (which had developed the Landing Craft Assault), gave the job to naval architect Sir Roland Baker, who within three days completed initial drawings for a  landing craft with a  beam and a shallow draft. Ship builders Fairfields and John Brown agreed to work out details for the design under the guidance of the Admiralty Experimental Works at Haslar. Designated the LCT Mark 1, 20 were ordered in July 1940 and a further 10 in October 1940.

The first LCT Mark 1 was launched by Hawthorn Leslie in November 1940. It was an all-welded 372-ton steel-hulled vessel that drew only  of water at the bow. Sea trials soon proved the Mark 1 to be difficult to handle and almost unmanageable in some sea conditions. The designers set about correcting the faults of the Mark 1 in the LCT Mark 2. Longer and wider, three Paxman diesel or Napier Lion petrol engines replaced the Hall-Scotts, and 15 and 20 lb. armoured shielding was added to the wheelhouse and gun tubs.

Even with this extra weight, the vessel was slightly faster than the Mark 1. The Mk.3 was accepted on 8 April 1941, and was prefabricated in five sections. The Mark 4 was slightly shorter and lighter than the Mk.3, but had a much wider beam and was intended for cross channel operations as opposed to seagoing use. When tested in early assault operations, like the ill-fated Canadian commando raid on Dieppe in 1942, the lack of manoeuvring ability led to the preference for a shorter overall length in future variants, most of which were built in the United States.

When the United States entered the war in December 1941, the U.S. Navy had no amphibious vessels at all, and found itself obliged to consider British designs already in existence. One of these, advanced by K.C. Barnaby of Thornycroft, was for a double-ended LCT to work with landing ships. The Bureau of Ships quickly set about drawing up plans for landing craft based on Barnaby's suggestions, although with only one ramp. The result, in early 1942, was the LCT Mark 5, a 117-foot craft with a beam of 32 feet that could accommodate five 30-ton or four 40-ton tanks or 150 tons of cargo. With a crew of twelve men and one officer, this 286 ton landing craft had the merit of being able to be shipped to combat areas in three separate water-tight sections aboard a cargo ship or carried pre-assembled on the flat deck of an LST. The Mk.5 would be launched by heeling the LST on its beam to let the craft slide off its chocks into the sea, or cargo ships could lower each of the three sections into the sea where they were joined.

A further development was the Landing Ship, Tank designation, built to support amphibious operations by carrying significant quantities of vehicles, cargo, and landing troops directly onto an unimproved shore. The British evacuation from Dunkirk in 1940 demonstrated to the Admiralty that the Allies needed relatively large, ocean-going ships capable of shore-to-shore delivery of tanks and other vehicles in amphibious assaults upon the continent of Europe. To carry 13 Churchill infantry tanks, 27 vehicles and nearly 200 men (in addition to the crew) at a speed of 18 knots, it could not have the shallow draught that would have made for easy unloading. As a result, each of the three (Boxer, Bruiser, and Thruster) ordered in March 1941 had a very long ramp stowed behind the bow doors.

In November 1941, a small delegation from the British Admiralty arrived in the United States to pool ideas with the United States Navy's Bureau of Ships with regard to development of ships and also including the possibility of building further Boxers in the US. During this meeting, it was decided that the Bureau of Ships would design these vessels. The LST(2) design incorporated elements of the first British LCTs from their designer, Sir Rowland Baker, who was part of the British delegation. This included sufficient buoyancy in the ships' sidewalls that they would float even with the tank deck flooded. The LST(2) gave up the speed of HMS Boxer at only 10 knots but had a similar load while drawing only 3 feet forward when beaching.

In three separate acts dated 6 February 1942, 26 May 1943, and 17 December 1943, Congress provided the authority for the construction of LSTs along with a host of other auxiliaries, destroyer escorts, and assorted landing craft. The enormous building program quickly gathered momentum. Such a high priority was assigned to the construction of LSTs that the previously laid keel of an aircraft carrier was hastily removed to make room for several LSTs to be built in her place. The keel of the first LST was laid down on 10 June 1942 at Newport News, Va., and the first standardized LSTs were floated out of their building dock in October. Twenty-three were in commission by the end of 1942. Lightly armored, they could steam cross the ocean with a full load on their own power, carrying infantry, tanks and supplies directly onto the beaches. Together with 2,000 other landing craft, the LSTs gave the troops a protected, quick way to make combat landings, beginning in summer 1943.

D-Day

The most famous amphibious assaults of the war, and of all time, were the Normandy landings on 6 June 1944, in which British, Canadian, and US forces landed at Utah, Omaha, Gold, Juno and Sword beaches in the largest amphibious operation in history.

The organizational planning of the landings (Operation Neptune) was in the hands of Admiral Bertram Ramsay. It covered the landing of the troops and their re-supply. Many innovative elements were included in the operation to ensure its success.

Operation Pluto was a scheme developed by Arthur Hartley, chief engineer with the Anglo-Iranian Oil Company, to construct an undersea oil pipeline under the English Channel between England and France to provide logistical support to the landed armies. Allied forces on the European continent required a tremendous amount of fuel. Pipelines were considered necessary to relieve dependence on oil tankers, which could be slowed by bad weather, were susceptible to German submarines, and were also needed in the Pacific War. Geoffrey William Lloyd, the Minister for Petroleum gained the support of Admiral Mountbatten, Chief of Combined Operations for the operation.

Two types of pipeline were developed. The first type was the flexible HAIS pipe with a  diameter lead core, weighing around 55 long tons per nautical mile, was essentially a development by Siemens Brothers (in conjunction with the National Physical Laboratory) of their existing undersea telegraph cables, and known as HAIS (from Hartley-Anglo-Iranian-Siemens). The second type was a less flexible steel pipe of similar diameter, developed by engineers from the Iraq Petroleum Company and the Burmah Oil Company.

In June 1942 the Post Office cable ship Iris laid lengths of both Siemens' and Henleys' cable in the Clyde. The pipeline was completely successful and PLUTO was formally brought into the plans for the invasion of Europe. The project was deemed "strategically important, tactically adventurous, and, from the industrial point of view, strenuous". After full-scale testing of an 83 km (45 nautical mile) HAIS pipe across the Bristol Channel between Swansea in Wales and Watermouth in North Devon, the first line to France was laid on 12 August 1944, over the 130 km (70 nautical miles) from Shanklin Chine on the Isle of Wight across the English Channel to Cherbourg Naval Base. A further HAIS pipe and two HAMELs followed. As the fighting moved closer to Germany, 17 other lines (11 HAIS and 6 HAMEL) were laid from Dungeness to Ambleteuse in the Pas-de-Calais.

In January 1945, 305 tonnes (300 long tons) of fuel was pumped to France per day, which increased tenfold to 3,048 tonnes (3,000 long tons) per day in March, and eventually to 4,000 tons (almost 1,000,000 Imperial gallons) per day. In total, over 781 000 m³ (equal to a cube with 92 metre long sides or over 172 million imperial gallons) of gasoline had been pumped to the Allied forces in Europe by VE day, providing a critical supply of fuel until a more permanent arrangement was made, although the pipeline remained in operation for some time after.

Portable harbours were also prefabricated as temporary facilities to allow rapid offloading of cargo onto the beaches during the Allied invasion of Normandy. The Dieppe Raid of 1942 had shown that the Allies could not rely on being able to penetrate the Atlantic Wall to capture a port on the north French coast. The problem was that large ocean-going ships of the type needed to transport heavy and bulky cargoes and stores needed sufficient depth of water under their keels, together with dockside cranes, to off-load their cargo and this was not available except at the already heavily defended French harbours. Thus, the Mulberries were created to provide the port facilities necessary to offload the thousands of men and vehicles, and tons of supplies necessary to sustain Operation Overlord and the Battle of Normandy. The harbours were made up of all the elements one would expect of any harbour: breakwater, piers, roadways etc.

At a meeting following the Dieppe Raid, Vice-Admiral John Hughes-Hallett declared that if a port could not be captured, then one should be taken across the Channel. The concept of Mulberry harbours began to take shape when Hughes-Hallett moved to be Naval Chief of Staff to the Overlord planners.

The proposed harbours called for many huge caissons of various sorts to build breakwaters and piers and connecting structures to provide the roadways. The caissons were built at a number of locations, mainly existing ship building facilities or large beaches like Conwy Morfa around the British coast. The works were let out to commercial construction firms including Balfour Beatty, Costain, Nuttall, Henry Boot, Sir Robert McAlpine and Peter Lind & Company, who all still operate today, and Cubitts, Holloway Brothers, Mowlem and Taylor Woodrow, who all have since been absorbed into other businesses that are still operating. On completion they were towed across the English Channel by tugs to the Normandy coast at only 4.3 Knots (8 km/h or 5 mph), built, operated and maintained by the Corps of Royal Engineers, under the guidance of Reginald D. Gwyther, who was appointed CBE for his efforts.

By 9 June, just 3 days after D-Day, two harbours codenamed Mulberry "A" and "B" were constructed at Omaha Beach and Arromanches, respectively. However, a large storm on 19 June destroyed the American harbour at Omaha, leaving only the British harbour still intact but damaged, which included damage to the 'Swiss Roll' which had been deployed as the most western floating roadway had to be taken out of service. The surviving Mulberry "B" came to be known as Port Winston at Arromanches. While the harbour at Omaha was destroyed sooner than expected, Port Winston saw heavy use for 8 months—despite being designed to last only 3 months. In the 10 months after D-Day, it was used to land over 2.5 million men, 500,000 vehicles, and 4 million tonnes of supplies providing much needed reinforcements in France.

Other
Other large amphibious operations in the European theatre of World War II and the war in the Pacific include:

Europe:

Pacific:

Korean War

During the Korean War the U.S. X Corps, consisting of the 1st Marine Division and 7th Infantry Division landed at Inchon. Conceived of and commanded by U.S. General Douglas MacArthur, this landing is considered by many military historians to have been a tactical jewel, one of the most brilliant amphibious maneuvers in history  (See analysis in main article).

The success of this battle eventually resulted in link up with U.S. Army forces that broke out of the Pusan perimeter, and led by the 1st Cavalry Division and its Task Force Lynch, cleared much of South Korea. A second landing by the Tenth Corps on the east coast approached the Chosin Reservoir and hydroelectric plants that powered much of Communist China's heavy industry, and led to intervention by Chinese forces on behalf of North Korea. Amphibious landings also took place during the First Indochina War, notably during Operation Camargue, one of the largest of the conflict.

Suez Crisis and Falklands War
The British Royal Marines made their first post-World War II amphibious assault during the Suez Crisis of 1956 when they successfully landed at Suez on 6 November as part of a joint seaborne/airborne operation code-named MUSKETEER.

Despite all the progress that was seen during World War II, there were still fundamental limitations in the types of coastline that were suitable for assault. Beaches had to be relatively free of obstacles, and have the right tidal conditions and the correct slope. However, the development of the helicopter fundamentally changed the equation.

The first use of helicopters in an amphibious assault came during the Anglo-French-Israeli invasion of Egypt in 1956 (the Suez War). Two British light fleet carriers were pressed into service to carry helicopters, and a battalion-sized airborne assault was made.

Nearly 30 years later in the Falklands War, the 1st Marines Brigade of the Argentine Marine Corps along with Navy's Special Forces performed Operation Rosario landing at Mullet Creek near Stanley on 2 April 1982, while later the Royal Marines' 3 Commando Brigade, (augmented by the British Army's Parachute Regiment) landed at Port San Carlos on 21 May 1982 during Operation Sutton.

Landing at Cyprus
The Turkish Armed Forces launched an amphibious assault on 20 July 1974, on Kyrenia, following the 1974 Cypriot coup d'état. The Turkish naval force provided naval gunfire support during the landing operation and transported the amphibious forces from the port of Mersin to the island. The Turkish landing forces consisted of around 3,000 troops, tanks, armoured personnel carriers and artillery pieces.

Iran-Iraq war

During the Iran–Iraq War, the Iranians launched Operation Dawn 8 (Persian: عملیات والفجر ۸), in which 100,000 troops comprising 5 Army divisions and 50,000 men from the IRGC and the Basij advanced in a two-pronged offensive into southern Iraq. Taking place between 9 and 25 February, the assault across the Shatt al-Arab achieved significant tactical and operational surprise. The Iranians launched their assault on the peninsula at night, their men arriving on rubber boats. Iranian Navy SEALs spearheaded the offensive despite a shortage of gear. Prior to this action Iranian Naval Commandos performed reconnaissance of the Faw Peninsula. The Iranian SEALs penetrated an obstacle belt and isolated Iraqi bunkers whose troops had taken cover from the heavy rains inside or were sleeping. Iranian demolition teams detonated charges on the obstacles to create a path for the Iranian infantry waiting to begin their assault.

Not only did the amphibious landings provide a significant lodgement behind Iraq's tactical front, but they also created a psychological shock wave throughout the Persian Gulf region. Soon after the initial landings, Iranian combat engineers were able to construct bridges to improve the flow of ground troops into the lodgement area. Iran managed to maintain their foothold in Al-Faw against several Iraqi counter-offensives and chemical attacks for another month despite heavy casualties until a stalemate was reached. The Faw Peninsula was later recaptured by Iraqi forces, by the massive and illegal use of chemical weapons, the same day as the US launched Operation Praying Mantis on Iran, destroying their navy.

Persian Gulf War
During the Persian Gulf War, Assault Craft Unit 5 was able to position U.S. Marine and naval support off the coast of Kuwait and Saudi Arabia. This force was composed of 40 amphibious assault ships, the largest such force to be assembled since the Battle of Inchon. The objective was to fix the six Iraqi divisions deployed along the Kuwaiti coast. The purpose behind this amphibious maneuver (known as an amphibious demonstration) was to prevent 6 Iraqi divisions poised for the defense of the littorals from being able to actively engage in combat at the real front. The operation was extremely successful in keeping more than 41,000 Iraqi forces from repositioning to the main battlefield. As a result, the Marines maneuvered through the Iraq defense of southern Kuwait and outflanked the Iraqi coastal defense forces.

Iraq War

An amphibious assault was carried out by Royal Marines, U.S. Marines and units of the Polish special forces when they landed at the Al-Faw Peninsula on 20 March 2003 during the Iraq War.

Invasion of Anjouan
On March 25, 2008, Operation Democracy in Comoros was launched in the Comoros by government and African Union troops. The amphibious assault led to the ousting of Colonel Bacar's government, which had taken over the autonomous state of Adjouan.

Battle of Kismayo (2012)
From September 28 to October 1, 2012, the Somali National Army led an assault in conjuncture with allied militia and Kenyan troops to liberate the city of Kismayo from insurgent control. The operation, known as Operation Sledge Hammer, started with the landing of Somali and Kenyan troops outside the city of Kismayo. By October 1, the coalition forces were able to push Al-Shabaab out of the city.

See also
 List of marines and naval infantry forces
 Marines
 Navy
 Raid (military)#Seaborne

Notes

References

Further reading
 Alexander, Joseph H., and Merrill L. Bartlett. Sea Soldiers in the Cold War: Amphibious Warfare, 1945-1991 (1994)
 Bartlett, Merrill L. Assault from the Sea: Essays on the History of Amphibious Warfare (1993)
 Dwyer, John B. Commandos From The Sea: The History Of Amphibious Special Warfare In World War II And The Korean War (1998)
 Ireland, Bernard. The World Encyclopedia of Amphibious Warfare Vessels: An illustrated history of modern amphibious warfare (2011)
 Isely, Jeter A., Philip A. Crowl. The U.S. Marines and Amphibious War Its Theory and Its Practice in the Pacific (1951)
 Millett, Allan R.  Semper Fidelis: History of the United States Marine Corps (2nd ed. 1991) ch 12-14
 Moore, Richard S. "Ideas and Direction: Building Amphibious Doctrine," Marine Corps Gazette (1982) 66#11 pp 49–58.
 Reber, John J. "Pete Ellis: Amphibious Warfare Prophet," U.S. Naval Institute Proceedings (1977) 103#11 pp 53–64.
 Venzon, Anne Cipriano. From Whaleboats to Amphibious Warfare: Lt. Gen. "Howling Mad" Smith and the U.S. Marine Corps (Praeger, 2003)

External links 

 
Warfare by type